The documented history of Murcia traces back at least to the Middle Ages, after Madinat Mursiya was built by Andalusi Emir Abd al-Rahman II in the 9th century, while it is suggested the city was erected over a previous settlement of Roman origin.

Middle Ages 
Madinat Mursiya was reportedly founded circa 825 upon the will of Umayyad Emir Abd al-Rahman II (other sources place its foundation by 831), in parallel to the destruction of neighbouring city of Eio. However, particularly on the light of the archeological evidence of earlier buildings with Christian symbology, there is an historiographical consensus on it being a re-foundation over an earlier Roman settlement tracing back to the 4th or 5th century AD.

The city prospered during the Caliphal era.

The taifa of Murcia was conquered by Muhammad ibn Aisha on behalf of the Almoravid Empire in June 1091. As the Almoravid Empire retreated, Abu ʿAbd Allāh Muḥammad ibn Saʿd ibn Mardanīš (Rey Lobo in Christian chronicles) established a new taifa in the mid-12th century, lasting from 1147 to 1172. During his reign Ibn Mardanis allied with Castile to counter the Almohad expansion.

In 1228, Ibn Hud, an Andalusi chieftain, rebelled against the Almohad Empire, entering the city of Murcia on 4 August 1228, establishing a new emirate (the third Taifa of Murcia), ruled by the Banu Hud. 

By 1240 the taifa was increasingly atomised, with several cities split from the nominal authority of the emir in the city of Murcia, who still claimed authority over the full jurisdiction. Before the triple military threat posed by Castile, Aragon and Granada, the Murcian Emir Muhammad al-Dawla opted to negotiate a treaty with the Castilian King Ferdinand III. After the 1243  was reached, the city and the rest of the taifa became a vassal state of the Crown of Castile. As a progressive breach of the conditions abided in the treaty of Alcaraz ensued, discontent increased among the Muslim population, leading to a full-blown insurrection, with the rebels in Murcia joining the 1264 Múdejar revolt. After the intervention of Aragon in 1265, the rebels surrendered the city to forces commanded by Jaime I of Aragon on 2 February 1266; the city was returned to his son-in-law Alfonso X of Castile by the middle of that year. Following the quelling of the rebellion, Alfonso X granted Murcia a charter and privileges similar to those of Seville in 1266.

Alfonso de la Cerda donated the Kingdom of Murcia to Jaime II of Aragon on 21 January 1296 in exchange for help vis-à-vis his challenge for the Castilian throne. The city remained under Aragonese control for eight years, until the delivering of the city signed on 16 November 1304, in compliance with the Treaty of Torrellas. The Castilian monarchs entrusted wide competences to a senior officer called the Adelantado Mayor over the whole Kingdom of Murcia (then a borderland of the Crown of Castile, nearing Granada and Aragon). The territory was to become subject of a nobiliary struggle for the political power between the lineage of Don Juan Manuel and the Fajardo family for much of the Late Middle Ages.

The city of Murcia suffered its first plague epidemic in 1348; reruns of the plague ensued in 1380 and 1395, with the 1395 outbreak decimating half the city population. Plague outbreaks of lesser magnitude continued to take place in the 15th century (also in the 16th century).

Early modern period 

The 1648 plage outbreak was particularly virulent in Murcia, reportedly having close to a 50% mortality rate. The last major plague epidemic in Spain affected Murcia in 1677.

Late modern period 

The Segura reached a flow of 1,900 m3/s in the city, leaving up to 761 deaths.

Population

References 
Citations

Bibliography
 
 
 
 
 
 
 
 
 

Murcia
Murcia